Tropical Storm Jerry was a tropical storm that caused severe flooding throughout the southeast United States in August of the 1995 Atlantic hurricane season. Jerry, the tenth tropical storm of the season, formed from a tropical wave that moved off the African coast in early August, which organized into a tropical depression and tropical storm between the Bahamas and Florida later in the month, before striking Florida in the latter part of the month. Its remnant circulation persisted until five days after landfall. At the time, Jerry was the earliest tenth storm to form in a season on record, until Jose in the 2005 season overtook it. Tropical Storm Jerry was also the first tropical cyclone to make landfall in South Florida since Hurricane Andrew in 1992.

Meteorological history

A tropical wave moved off the west coast of Africa on August 9. It moved westward across the Atlantic Ocean, and reached the Lesser Antilles on August 15. On August 22, convection organized while the system was over the western Bahamas, and it developed into Tropical Depression Eleven later that day. Conditions were only marginally favorable due to lack of outflow to its west, but the depression strengthened to reach tropical storm status on August 23.

It continued to the northwest across the state, and remained a tropical storm until late on August 24 when it entered the Gulf of Mexico over Citrus County. It remained over waters briefly until moving inland in Dixie County on August 25. It continued slowly northward, entering Georgia on August 26. The weak depression turned to the east, and dissipated into a trough of low pressure on August 28 near the Georgia/South Carolina border. The trough developed two circulation centers, one of which moved eastward while the other moved southward. The latter drifted southwestward across Florida until dissipating in early September. It is unknown if either of the circulations are directly related to the original center of Jerry.

Preparations

Because much of the circulation was over land, Jerry was not predicted to intensify to a tropical storm. This caused tropical storm warnings not to be issued until just hours before landfall.  While crossing over the state, the storm retained its strength, causing officials to issue Tropical Storm Warnings over the Florida Panhandle. However, Jerry remained a tropical depression over the Gulf of Mexico, and the warnings were dropped after Jerry's second landfall.

Impact

Florida
Rainfall was generally moderate in the southeastern portion of the state, with the highest amounts of over  occurring in Palm Beach County. The storm caused two weak tornadoes and one waterspout, though damage was minimal. In addition, Jerry caused light beach erosion.

While wind damage was minimal, the heavy flooding left many roads across the state under water. In addition, it damaged 340 houses and destroyed 12, most of which were in Collier County.  In northwestern Florida, the flooding caused severe damage to the citrus crop, with total agricultural damage amounting to $15 million.  In all, damage in Florida amounted to $19 million (1995 USD). The storm also caused two indirect deaths in the state, though no fatalities were directly attributed to Jerry.

Georgia
In Georgia, Jerry dropped severe rainfall of over  near Surrency, covering numerous waterways and flooding numerous houses.   A state of emergency was declared within Georgia as Jerry moved through the state.  Flooding from the storm across Georgia was mild to moderate due to the very dry conditions which preceded Jerry's arrival.  In Savannah,  of rainfall was measured, which flooded the Ogeechee and Savannah Rivers.

South Carolina
The significant rainfall led to flooding along the Saluda, the Edisto, the Broad, and the Congaree Rivers in South Carolina. Dam breaks were also reported, which led to flooding which covered numerous roadways and washed out bridges, with the statewide transportation damage totaling $4.5 million (1995 USD). In addition, houses were flooded and fields covered, which caused a damage total of $10 million (1995 USD). Jerry also killed 3 people in the state.

North Carolina
This led to flooding along the Neuse, the French Broad, the Warned, the Lynches, the Black, the Little Pee Dee, the Pee Dee, and the Waccomaw rivers. Across the state, numerous roads, including portions of Interstate 85, and houses were submerged. In the Charlotte area, the flooding forced the evacuation of 63 people from a nursing home, as well as 200 people from a pair of apartment complexes. Mecklenburg County reported damages of $5 million (1995 USD). In Raleigh, over 140 buildings or houses were damaged or destroyed, resulting a damage total in the area of $6 million (1995 USD). In all, Jerry caused $11 million (1995 USD) in damage across the state and 3 fatalities.
It washed out Perry Mill Pond's dam outside of Zebulon NC on SR 1001.

See also

 Potential Tropical Cyclone Ten (2017) – Caused severe flooding in the same areas 22 years later
 Hurricane Irma (2017) – Destructive Category 5 hurricane that affected many of the same areas
 List of Atlantic hurricanes
 List of North Carolina hurricanes (1980–1999)
 List of tropical cyclones
 List of wettest tropical cyclones in South Carolina
 Timeline of the 1995 Atlantic hurricane season

References

External links

 NHC Jerry Report

Jerry
Jerry (1995)
Jerry
Jerry
Jerry
Jerry
1995 natural disasters in the United States
1995 in Florida
1995 in Georgia (U.S. state)
1995 in South Carolina
1995 in North Carolina